The siege of Ceuta of 1419 (sometimes reported as 1418) was fought between the besieging forces of the Marinid Sultanate of Morocco, led by Sultan Abu Said Uthman III, including allied forces from the Emirate of Granada, and the Portuguese garrison of Ceuta, led by Pedro de Menezes, 1st Count of Vila Real. After the loss of the city in a surprise attack in 1415 known as the Conquest of Ceuta, the Sultan gathered an army four years later and besieged the city. The Portuguese gathered a fleet under the command of Princes Henry the Navigator and John of Reguengos to relieve Ceuta. According to the chroniclers, the relief fleet turned out to be quite unnecessary. In a bold gambit, D. Pedro de Menezes led the Portuguese garrison in a sally against the Marinid siege camp and forced the lifting of the siege before the relief fleet even arrived.

Blamed for losing Ceuta, the Marinid sultan was assassinated in a coup in Fez in 1420, leaving only a child as his heir. Morocco descended into anarchic chaos, as rival pretenders vied for the throne and local governors carved out regional fiefs for themselves, selling their support to the highest bidder. The political crisis in Morocco released the pressure on Ceuta for the next few years.

Notes

Conflicts in 1418
Conflicts in 1419
History of Ceuta
Ceuta 1419
Portuguese colonisation in Africa
1418
1419
1418 in Portugal
1419 in Portugal
Ceuta
Ceuta (1419)
15th century in Morocco
15th century in Al-Andalus
Morocco–Portugal military relations